Peter Corney (born 18th century, died 31 August 1835) was an English sailor and explorer. A veteran of many Pacific crossings, he is probably best known for his work Voyages in the Northern Pacific; Narrative of Several Trading Voyages from 1813 to 1818... He also gained a note of notoriety from his 1818 exploits as captain of the Argentinian sailing vessel Santa Rosa while in the employ of French privateer Hippolyte de Bouchard.

Corney died on 31 August 1835 in the company of his family while traversing the English Channel.

References

External links
 Corney, Peter at Bookworld Author Bank

18th-century births
1835 deaths
English explorers
English explorers of the Pacific